Francis John Sparks (4 July 1855 – 13 February 1934) was an English amateur footballer, who played as a forward. He won the FA Cup in 1880 with Clapham Rovers and made three appearances for England, scoring three goals and being appointed captain.

Career
Sparks was born in Billericay, Essex and played for St Albans Pilgrims in 1873. He switched to join Brondesbury later that year for the rest of the season, and was part of the team defeated 5–0 by eventual finalists Royal Engineers in the FA Cup first round in October.

Between 1876 and 1878 he played for Upton Park before joining Hertfordshire Rangers. His first England appearance came against Scotland on 5 April 1879. The match was played at the Kennington Oval and had originally been scheduled for 1 April but was postponed because of heavy snowfall. At half time, England were 4–1 down to the Scots. Charlie Bambridge scored early in the second half and his teammates had levelled the score by the 75th minute. With less than ten minutes remaining, the Scots scored what they thought was the winning goal but the referee disallowed it as offside. The English forwards then raced upfield with Bambridge scoring the winning goal, thus enabling England to claim their first victory over the Scots since 1873 in what was described as "the most exciting England and Scotland game to date".

Sparks then joined Clapham Rovers, helping them to reach the final of the 1880 FA Cup. In the final against Oxford University Sparks was involved in the winning goal; with the prospect of extra time imminent, Sparks "made a clever run down the wing, crossed to the waiting Clopton Lloyd-Jones who had the simple task of slotting the ball between the Oxford goalposts to secure a one-goal lead." This was last appearance in an FA Cup Final for both teams.

In the month before the Cup Final, Sparks had made his last two international appearances. On 13 March he again played in the match against Scotland, this time played at Hampden Park, Glasgow. The match ended in a 5–4 victory for the Scots (the most goals England have ever scored in a game and lost). Sparks scored England's third goal, with two of England's goals coming from Charlie Bambridge, whereas Scotland's scorers included a hat-trick from George Ker. His Clapham teammate, Norman Bailey also played in this match, at half back.

Sparks' final England appearance came away to Wales on 15 March, when he was appointed team captain. Six players made their England debut in this match which England won 3–2 with two goals scored by Sparks. Tom Brindle, who also scored, had to leave the game in the second half due to injury, and England played on with ten men.

Sparks later represented Essex and London, and was a member of the Football Association Committee from 1876 to 1880. He married in September 1884. He died on 13 February 1934 aged 78. He was also a member of the Wanderers club.

Honours
Clapham Rovers
FA Cup winner: 1880

International goals

Scores and results list England's goal tally first.

References

External links

England profile

1855 births
1934 deaths
People from Billericay
English footballers
England international footballers
Upton Park F.C. players
Clapham Rovers F.C. players
Wanderers F.C. players
Association football forwards
FA Cup Final players